This is a list of German television related events from 1977.

Events
7 May - West Germany's Silver Convention finish 8th at the 1977 Eurovision Song Contest in London.

Debuts

ARD
 31 May – Das Haus mit der Nr. 30 (1977–1979)
 21 May – Sore - Gestohlenes aus der Wirklichkeit (1977–1978)
 26 June – Uncle Silas (1977)
 1 October – Polizeiinspektion 1 (1977–1988)
 21 October – Sun, Wine and Hard Nuts (1977–1981)
 13 November – Die seltsamen Abenteuer des Herman van Veen (1977)
 20 November – Die Dämonen (1977)
 12 December – Eichholz und Söhne  (1977–1978)
 Unknown – Geschäft mit der Sonne (1977)

ZDF
 19 January – 
 Die drei Klumberger  (1977)
 Zum kleinen Fisch (1977)
 20 January – Pfarrer in Kreuzberg (1977)
 26 January – Auf der Suche nach dem Glück (1977)
 20 February – Ein verrücktes Paar (1977–1980)
 20 March – Ein Mann kam im August (1977)
 11 April – The Old Fox (1977–Present)
 30 April – Peter Voss, Thief of Millions (1977)
 11 May – Es muß nicht immer Kaviar sein (1977)
 26 May – Fragen Sie Frau Erika (1977)
 4 August – Drei sind einer zuviel (1977)
 10 August – Kennen Sie die Lindemanns? (1977)
 3 November – Aus dem Logbuch der Peter Petersen (1977–1978)
 24 December – Neues aus Uhlenbusch (1977–1982)

DFF
 7 January –  Zur See (1977)

Ending this year
  Schnickschnack (since 1975)
 Hans und Lene (since 1976)
 Notarztwagen 7 (since 1976)

Bibliography
 Knut Hickethier. Das Fernsehspiel der Bundesrepublik: Themen, Form, Struktur, Theorie und Geschichte ; 1951-1977. Metzler, 1980.